Bharat Biotech International Limited (BBIL) is an Indian multinational biotechnology company headquartered in the city of Hyderabad, India engaged in the drug discovery, drug development, manufacture of vaccines, bio-therapeutics, pharmaceuticals and health care products.

Overview
Bharat Biotech has its manufacturing facility situated at Genome Valley, Hyderabad, India. As of July 2020, the company has over 700 employees and has a presence worldwide.

The company has been responsible for developing an eco-friendly recombinant and a naturally attenuated strain derived Rotavirus vaccine called ROTAVAC. They were one of the first to develop vaccines for viral diseases like Chikungunya and Zika. The company also produces vaccines for Japanese Encephalitis. Bharat Biotech has biosafety level 3 (BSL3) laboratories.

COVID-19 vaccine development

In April 2020, the company announced that they have partnered with US-based company FluGen and University of Wisconsin-Madison to develop a COVID-19 vaccine.

In May 2020, Indian Council of Medical Research's (ICMR's) National Institute of Virology approved and provided the virus strains for developing a fully indigenous COVID-19 vaccine. On June 29, 2020, the company got permission to conduct Phase 1 and Phase 2 clinical trials in India for a developmental COVID-19 vaccine named Covaxin, from the Drugs Controller General of India (DCGI), Government of India. The Central Drugs Laboratory (CDL) at Kasauli in Himachal Pradesh has been engaged in testing experimental batches of Bharat Biotech's COVID-19 vaccine Covaxin on a priority basis. A total of 12 sites were selected by the Indian Council for Medical Research for Phase I and II randomised, double-blind and placebo-controlled clinical trials of vaccine candidate.

In September 2020, the company announced that it was going to manufacture the novel chimp-adenovirus, a single dose intranasal vaccine (codenamed BBV154) for COVID-19 being developed in collaboration with the American company Precision virologics and Washington University School of Medicine in St. Louis, Missouri. It is currently undergoing clinical trials. On October 12 2021, Bharat Biotech's Covaxin got approved for usage on children between 2 and 18 years of age.

Attempted data theft 
In March 2021, Reuters reported that Chinese state-backed cyber-espionage group Red Apollo targeted Bharat Biotech's intellectual property for exfiltration.

See also
 Serum Institute of India
 Cadila Healthcare
 Biotechnology in India

References

External links
 Official site

Pharmaceutical companies of India
Manufacturing companies based in Hyderabad, India
Vaccine producers
Pharmaceutical companies established in 1996
Biotechnology companies of India
Biotechnology companies established in 1996
COVID-19 pandemic in India
Indian companies established in 1996
Indian brands
1996 establishments in Andhra Pradesh
BSL3 laboratories in India
COVID-19 vaccine producers